Roger Mar (born April 30, 1968) is an American sports shooter. He competed at the 1992 Summer Olympics and the 1996 Summer Olympics.

References

1968 births
Living people
American male sport shooters
Olympic shooters of the United States
Shooters at the 1992 Summer Olympics
Shooters at the 1996 Summer Olympics
Sportspeople from Colorado Springs, Colorado